UHC may refer to:

Companies 
 Union Hand-Roasted Coffee, a British coffee roasting company in East London
 United Healthcare, brand of U.S. health insurer UnitedHealth Group
 University HealthSystem Consortium, one of the predecessor companies for Vizient, Inc.

Computing 
 Unified Hangul Code, Windows character encoding for Korean
 UDP Host Cache, technique used by file sharing networks such as Gnutella
 Utrecht Haskell Compiler, an implementation of the Haskell programming language

Hospitals 
 University Hospital Coventry, hospital in Coventry, West Midlands
 University Hospital Crosshouse, hospital in Kilmarnock, Scotland
 University Hospitals of Cleveland, a major not-for-profit medical complex in Cleveland, Ohio

Places 
 Upper Hat Creek, rural locality in British Columbia, Canada
 Upper Hopkins Cascade, a waterfall found in the Borer’s Falls Conservation Area in Flamborough, Hamilton, Ontario

Sports 
 UHC Stockerau, a women’s handball club from Stockerau in Austria
 UHC Waldkirch-St. Gallen, a Swiss floorball team
 UHC Zugerland, a Swiss floorball club from the canton of Zug
 UNC Health Care, a not-for-profit medical system owned by the State of North Carolina and based in Chapel Hill
 UCW-Zero Heavyweight Championship, a professional wrestling championship
 UWC Heavyweight Championship, a professional wrestling championship
 UWF Heavyweight Championship, a professional wrestling championship
 UniKL Hockey Club, a field hockey League from Kuala Lumpur, Malaysia
 United Hospitals Cup, rugby cup contested by the six medical schools in London

Other 
 Universal health care, a social-benefit program
 Unburned hydrocarbon, a category of toxic engine emission
 Ultimate Holding Company, a British arts collective known for «This is Camp X-Ray» and «Ext-inked»
 Upper Hutt College, a secondary school in Upper Hutt, New Zealand
 Uttarakhand High Court, a superior court in the state of Uttarakhand, India
 Ultra Hardcore, a type of Minecraft server gamemode

See also 
 
 United Hebrew Congregation (disambiguation)
 CUH (disambiguation)
 HCU (disambiguation)
 HUC (disambiguation)
 UCH (disambiguation)